Ratt is the first official record by American glam metal band Ratt. It was originally released on the band's Time Coast label, with the help of the band's manager Marshall Berle.

Background
The version of "Back for More" featured on this EP is an earlier recording than the one on the album Out of the Cellar. The European version also features an earlier recording of "You're in Trouble" as a bonus track, believed to feature Joey Cristofanilli on bass guitar. A cover of Rufus Thomas' "Walkin' the Dog" is also included, presumably as a nod to the 1973 Aerosmith version. It is also noted for the strong lead guitar presence of guitarist Robbin Crosby, whose trademark "blues with a twist" solos are prominent through the first four songs. An early version of "Tell the World" (which did not feature Blotzer or Croucier) was also featured on the compilation Metal Massacre, but was removed from later pressings. "U Got It" often opened the show circa 1983-84, and Pearcy did the same during his Nitronic 'Pure Hell' Tour in 2000.

In 1984, Atlantic Records remixed and re-released this EP following the success of Out of the Cellar. This reissue featured a glossier production mix to match the band's recent mainstream success, as well as an updated back cover photo of the group with a more pronounced Sunset Strip glam appearance.

The legs on the front cover belong to Tawny Kitaen, the then-girlfriend of guitarist Crosby. She later also posed on the cover of the band's 1984 album Out of the Cellar.

Track listing
All tracks written by Robbin Crosby and Stephen Pearcy, except where indicated. Arrangements by Ratt.

Personnel 
Ratt
Stephen Pearcy – lead vocals
Robbin Crosby – guitars, backing vocals
Warren DeMartini – guitars, backing vocals
Juan Croucier – bass guitar, backing vocals
Bobby Blotzer – drums
Joey Cristofanilli - bass on "You're in Trouble"

Production
Liam Sternberg – producer
Ed Stasium – engineer and mixer
Mark Leonard – executive producer

Charts

References

1983 debut EPs
Ratt albums
Music for Nations albums
Self-released EPs